Quyi ("melodious art") and shuochang yishu ("speaking and singing art") are umbrella terms for over 300 regional genres of traditional Chinese oral performing arts. Quyi is distinguished from xiqu (Chinese opera) by its emphasis on narration, as opposed to acting, although they share many elements including the same traditional stories. Quyi artists generally wear no to little makeup. Musical instruments like drums, wooden clappers, pipa, yangqin, or sanxian are commonly seen in quyi, as are hand fans.

History
While the storytelling art concept has been around for centuries, the narrative art concept was mostly recognized in the 1920s. Only after 1949 with the founding of the People's Republic of China did the term quyi become widely used. Prior to this, it was just classified as shuochang yishu.  This is one of the art category that gained momentum since the New Culture Movement. With the exception of the Cultural Revolution period, a great number of stories written for this art are preserved.

Presentation
The story is usually told by a small number of people.  The most standard number is 1 or 2, sometimes extending to 4 or higher. Quyi is often accompanied by clappers, drums, or stringed instruments, with the presenter wearing costumes at times.  Unlike Chinese operas which has a fixed style for costume, quyi costumes vary depending on the era of the story plot. Costumes range from dynastic period hanfu to the more modern qipao or even suits.

The language used is usually associated with the spoken dialect of the local area. Sometimes it uses rhymed verse, some in prose, and some combine both. A lot of body movements may be used in the portrayal of the characters in the story. Each person may play multiple roles for multiple characters in the story. It is also this local and regional feel for the art that some would classify it as Chinese folk art.

Regions
Outside of mainland China, this entertainment form is also found in Taiwan.

Varieties
Baiju - Nanjing
Dagu
Jingdong daguTianjin
Jingyun dagu
Xihe Dagu
DanxianBeijing zh
Kuaiban
Pinghua
Pingshu
Pingtan
Shuoshu
Tanci
Xiangsheng
Xiangshu
Yangzhou pinghuaYangzhou, Jiangsu
ZhuiziHenan

References

Performing arts in China
Chinese storytelling
Chinese styles of music